Mazierski or (feminine) Mazierska is a Polish surname. Notable people with this name include:
Ewa Mazierska (born 1964), Polish cinema scholar
Janina Mazierska (born 1948), Polish microwave engineer
 (1889–1959), Polish Calvinist clergyman
 (1915–1993), Polish theologian

Polish-language surnames